The Curtiss XP-42 was an experimental fighter built by Curtiss Aircraft in the late 1930s to research engine cooling and improving the performance of the Curtiss P-36.

Design and development
The fourth production P-36 (serial 38-004) became a development platform for a direct successor, designated XP-42 by the USAAC. The XP-42 was powered by a Pratt & Whitney R-1830-31 engine fitted with a longer, streamlined cowling and a large propeller spinner. These features attempted to improve the aerodynamics of the air-cooled radial engine. Because of this feature, the XP-42 superficially resembled aircraft equipped with in-line liquid-cooled engines (such as the P-40, another development of the P-36). 

When the XP-42 first flew in March 1939, it proved to be faster than the P-36. However, the P-40 was faster still and the new nose cowling caused engine cooling problems that proved to be unresolvable, despite at least 12 sets of modifications. The XP-42 project was canceled. However, the XP-42 prototype was retained as a test-bed and was later fitted with an all-moving tail (stabilator), for research purposes. This aircraft was scrapped on July 15, 1947.

Specifications (XP-42)

See also
Related development
Curtiss P-36 – precursor of the P-40
Curtiss YP-37 – an experimental design based on the P-36
Curtiss P-40
Curtiss XP-46 – another design based on the P-40; not put into production

References

XP-42
Curtiss XP-42
Single-engined tractor aircraft
Low-wing aircraft
Aircraft first flown in 1939